Theodosis Macheras (born 9 May 2000) is a Greek professional footballer who plays as a forward for Super League club AEK Athens.

Career

AEK Athens
On 1 March 2020, Macheras made his official debut in a 1–1 away draw against Panionios. On 22 November 2020, he scored his first professional goal, helping to a 4–1 home win against AEL.

On 2 February 2021, Macheras signed a new contract, running until the summer of 2026.

Loan to Ionikos
On 4 August 2021, he joined Ionikos on a season long-loan.

Career statistics

References

External links

2000 births
Living people
Greek footballers
Greece under-21 international footballers
Greece youth international footballers
Super League Greece players
AEK Athens F.C. players
Ionikos F.C. players
Association football forwards
People from Leros
Sportspeople from the South Aegean
21st-century Greek people